Howrah Bridge is a 2018 Telugu language romance film directed by Revan Yadhu. It stars Rahul Ravindran and Chandini Chowdary.

Cast

Rahul Ravindran as Arjun
Chandini Chowdary as Sweety
Ajay as Bava
Manali Rathod as Sweety
Rao Ramesh
Ali
Vidyullekha Raman as Saroja

Soundtrack

Reviews

Indiaglitz gave the film 1.75 out of 5 stating, "Atrocious scenes, double-timers who deserve their share of miseries, mind-numbing performances, and a ridiculously-mounted climax".

Thehans India criticized the double meaning dialogue and the chemistry between the lead artists.

References

External links 
 

2010s Telugu-language films